Giulio Antamoro (1 July 1877 – 8 December 1945) was an Italian film director mainly active during the silent era.

Selected filmography

 The Adventures of Pinocchio (1911)
 Miss Dorothy (1920)
 Don Carlos (1921)
 La fanciulla di Pompei (1925)
 The Passion of St. Francis (1927)
 The Case of Prosecutor M (1928)
 Saint Anthony of Padua (1931)
 Fanfulla da Lodi (1940)
 The White Angel (1943)

References

Bibliography
 Geoffrey Nowell-Smith. The Oxford History of World Cinema. Oxford University Press, 1997.

External links

1877 births
1945 deaths
Film directors from Rome